Zoran "Čivija" Kovačić (born October 13, 1948) is a Serbian former professional basketball coach. He is considering for one of the best coaches for women's basketball in Serbia.

Coaching career 
Kovačić began his coaching career in men's basketball in 1967 in Karaburma. After five years he moved to the women's team of Crvena zvezda. In 1990, he became head coach of their first team. Later he became coach of the Kovin, Levski Sofia and the Budućnost Podgorica. In 2002, he took care of the young teams of the Serbia and Montenegro national team, as well as, young teams of the Serbia.

Kovačić won twelve Yugoslav Women's Championship for Juniors and seven Yugoslav Women's Championship for Cadets with Crvena zvezda youth selections. He won the Yugoslav Women's Coach of the Year award eight times.

National team coaching career  
Kovačić also coached the Serbia and Montenegro women's national team at 2005 European Women's Basketball Championship in  Turkey. He was a coach of Serbia and Montenegro youth national teams from 2002 to 2006, and later of Serbia until 2013.

Career achievements and awards

Titles 
 Yugoslav League champion: 1  (with Crvena zvezda: 1991–92)
 Yugoslav Women's Basketball Cup champion: 1  (with Crvena zvezda: 1991–92)
 Serbia and Montenegro League champion: 2  (with Crvena zvezda: 1992–93; with Budućnost Podgorica: 2002–03)
 Serbia and Montenegro Cup winner : 2  (with Crvena zvezda: 1993–94; with Kovin: 1999–00)

Individual 
 Slobodan Piva Ivković Award for Lifetime Achievement — 2022
 Coach of the year in Serbia — 1979, 1981, 1985
 Coach of the year in Yugoslavia – 1992, 1993, 1995, 2000
 The Charter of SD Crvena Zvezda
 The Golden Badge of SD Crvena Zvezda
 The Golden Plaque of SD Crvena Zvezda

References

External links 
 Sportski spomenar #414

1948 births
Living people
Sportspeople from Šabac
Serbia and Montenegro national basketball team coaches
Serbian men's basketball coaches
Serbian basketball executives and administrators
Serbian expatriate basketball people in Bulgaria
Serbian expatriate basketball people in Montenegro
Yugoslav basketball coaches
ŽKK Crvena zvezda coaches